Florence Melian Stawell (2 May 1869 – 9 June 1936) was a classical scholar.

Career

Florence Melian Stawell, youngest daughter of Sir William Foster Stawell, was born at Melbourne on 2 May 1869.  She was named for the Melians, ancient Greek idealists from Melos of whom Thucydides had written, and was known as Melian. (Melian was a given name in the family since Melian Allin married Jonas Stawell at Cork in 1734. The name had descended through the female line of the Allin, Twogood and Deane families from Melian Wallis who married Matthew Deane of Bristol in 1647.)

She spent two years at Trinity College, the University of Melbourne, where she was greatly influenced by the Warden, Dr Alexander Leeper. She then went to England and entered Newnham College, Cambridge, in the May term of 1889. She was placed in class 1, division 1 in the classical tripos of 1892 but did not take part II of the tripos. In 1894-5, Miss Stawell was a classical don at Newnham but had to resign on account of ill health and henceforth lived chiefly at London with occasional visits to her relations in Australia. 

In 1909, she published Homer and the Iliad: an Essay to determine the Scope and Character of the Original Poem, a scholarly contribution to the literature of the subject. In 1911, she offered an interpretation of the Phaistos Disc as Homeric Greek, syllabic writing.

In 1918, she prepared The Price of Freedom, an Anthology for all Nations, and, five years later in collaboration with Francis Sydney Marvin, brought out The Making of the Western Mind. She was associated with Goldsworthy Lowes Dickinson in the production of Goethe and Faust; an Interpretation, which appeared in 1928. Miss Stawell's next book was a translation in English verse of the Iphigeneia at Aulis of Euripides, which was published in 1929, and an excellent little book in the home university library on The Growth of International Thought belongs to the same year. 

She had been doing much work on the Minoan script and in 1931 published A Clue to the Cretan Scripts. The Practical Wisdom of Goethe: an Anthology, which appeared in 1933, was partly translated by her. She died at Oxford on 9 June 1936. 

Stawell was a member of the Society for Psychical Research.

References

External links

K. J. McKay, 'Stawell, Florence Melian (1869 - 1936)', Australian Dictionary of Biography, Volume 12, Melbourne University Pressю, 1990, pp 55-56.

1869 births
1936 deaths
Australian academics
Hellenists
People educated at Trinity College (University of Melbourne)
Alumni of Newnham College, Cambridge
Fellows of Newnham College, Cambridge
Parapsychologists
19th-century Australian women writers
20th-century Australian women writers